Dare to Dream is the independent debut EP by Australian singer Troye Sivan. The EP was released when Sivan was 12 years old and consists of five cover versions. The EP was released less than a year after Sivan had appeared on the popular annual Australian fundraising program, the Channel Seven Perth Telethon in October 2006. In 2007, Sivan reached the final of a Star Search competition.

In 2019, Sivan recounts selling the CD through his own website and sending his mother to the post office "laden with packages" to post.

Track listing

Personnel
Credits adapted from the liner notes of Dare to Dream.

 Troye Sivan – vocals 
 Toni Italiano – engineer 
 Sonja Plummer – backing vocals ; vocal coach
 Roger Stoch – cover photo, design

References

2007 debut EPs
Covers EPs
Troye Sivan EPs